Mario Seidl (born 8 December 1992) is an Austrian nordic combined skier. He debuted in the World Cup in the 2011–12 season in Val di Fiemme, Italy on 3 February 2012, finishing 36th in the Large Hill. His first podium in the World Cup was in the 2016–17 World Cup which was held at PyeongChang, South Korea in February 2017, where he finished second. His first win came in Ruka, Finland, in November 2018.

In January 2019, he won the trophy in the Nordic Combined Triple.

World Cup wins

References

External links

1992 births
Living people
Austrian male Nordic combined skiers
FIS Nordic World Ski Championships medalists in Nordic combined
Nordic combined skiers at the 2018 Winter Olympics
Nordic combined skiers at the 2022 Winter Olympics
Olympic Nordic combined skiers of Austria
Olympic bronze medalists for Austria
Olympic medalists in Nordic combined
Medalists at the 2018 Winter Olympics